The Road Safety World Series is an international T20 cricket league, which features former international cricketers, and is organized by the Road Safety World Series (RSWS) organization to raise awareness about road safety.

The tournament will be played in 2022 with New Zealand Legends making their debut and the return of Australia Legends, who withdrew from the first edition of the tournament due to their inability to travel in India owing to the strict COVID-19 restrictions in Australia.

India Legends 
Sachin Tendulkar returned as the captain of the India Legends for the second edition having led them to the title in the first edition. Harbhajan Singh, Suresh Raina, Stuart Binny, Abhimanyu Mithun and Rahul Sharma were added to the squad for the second edition.

Suresh Raina confirmed his participation for Road Safety World Series after he announced his retirement from all formats of cricket. Virender Sehwag, Mohammad Kaif and Zaheer Khan were notable players missing from this edition of the tournament having played in the earlier edition in 2021.

Sri Lanka Legends
Tillakaratne Dilshan returned as the captain for Sri Lanka Legends for the second edition after leading them to the finals in the first edition. Thisara Perera, Asela Gunaratne, Dilshan Munaweera, Dilruwan Perera, Isuru Udana, Mahela Udawatte, Rumesh Silva, Chaturanga de Silva, Ishan Jayaratne and Jeevan Mendis were added to the squad for the 2022 edition. 

Chaminda Vaas returned to the squad after he played just two matches in the first edition before the tournament was halted due to COVID-19 pandemic in 2020.

South Africa Legends
Jonty Rhodes returned as the captain for South Africa Legends after having led them in the first edition. Vernon Philander, Eddie Leie, Henry Davids, and Johan Botha were added to the squad for the 2022 edition.

Lance Klusener, Johan van der Wath and Jacques Rudolph made a comeback to the squad having pulled out from the earlier edition due to COVID-19 pandemic in 2020.

West Indies Legends
Brian Lara returned as the captain of the West Legends squad, after having led them in the first edition. Devendra Bishoo, Jerome Taylor, Daren Powell, Marlon Black, Dario Barthley, Dave Mohammed and Krishmar Santokie were added to the squad for the 2022 edition.

Australia Legends
Australia Legends returned for the second edition of tournament after having pulled out from the first edition of the tournament due to their inability to travel in India owing to the strict COVID-19 restrictions in Australia. 

Shane Watson was named as the captain of the side replacing Brett Lee. Alex Doolan, Ben Dunk, Stuart Clark, Bryce McGain, Callum Ferguson, Cameron White, George Horlin, Dirk Nannes and Chadd Sayers were added to the squad for the second edition for the tournament.

England Legends
Ian Bell replaced Kevin Pietersen as the captain of England Legends for the second edition of the tournament. Rikki Clarke, Stuart Meaker, Mal Loye, Stephen Parry, Jade Dernbach, Tim Ambrose, Dimitri Mascarenhas and Matt Prior were added to the squad for the tournament.

Kevin Pietersen, Owais Shah, Ryan Sidebottom and Monty Panesar were notable names missing from the England Legends squad, having played the earlier edition in 2021.

Bangladesh Legends
Shahadat Hossain replaced Mohammad Rafique as the captain of Bangladesh Legends. Aftab Ahmed, Nazmus Sadat, Dhiman Ghosh, Dolar Mahmud, Elias Sunny, Abul Hasan and Tushar Imran were added to the squad for the second edition of the tournament.

New Zealand Legends 
In 2022, New Zealand Legends were added to the tournament marking their debut in Road Safety World Series. The team is led by Ross Taylor.

References

Twenty20 cricket matches
2022 in cricket
Road safety campaigns